Rubén Ramos Martínez (born 31 January 1989) is a Spanish professional footballer who plays for Las Rozas CF as a forward.

Club career
Born in Leganés, Madrid, Ramos only played lower league football in his country, starting out at Atlético Madrid B in the 2007–08 season. In 2009, he moved to city rivals Real Madrid, and was assigned to the reserves also in the Segunda División B.

Free agent Ramos signed with Italian club Brescia Calcio in August 2011, but the international clearance only arrived two months later. He played the first of only four matches as a professional on 8 October, coming on as a 68th-minute substitute in a 2–1 away loss against Calcio Padova in the Serie B.

Ramos returned to Spain in January 2012, joining Lucena CF of the third division. He continued to compete in that tier in the following years, representing CF Fuenlabrada, CD Puerta Bonita, CD Alcoyano, Real Murcia, UD San Sebastián de los Reyes, Internacional de Madrid (two spells) and CD Castellón.

References

External links

1989 births
Living people
People from Leganés
Spanish footballers
Footballers from the Community of Madrid
Association football forwards
Segunda División B players
Primera Federación players
Tercera Federación players
Atlético Madrid B players
Real Madrid Castilla footballers
Lucena CF players
CF Fuenlabrada footballers
CD Alcoyano footballers
Real Murcia players
UD San Sebastián de los Reyes players
Internacional de Madrid players
CD Castellón footballers
Las Rozas CF players
Serie B players
Brescia Calcio players
Spain youth international footballers
Spanish expatriate footballers
Expatriate footballers in Italy
Spanish expatriate sportspeople in Italy